Aurinko (1992) is an album by the Finnish rock group CMX. The word "Aurinko" means "The Sun" in Finnish. The album cover depicts a cross section of a pineapple.

The album was the first to mark a considerable move towards more mainstream rock from the band's hardcore roots, with more streamlined approach to songwriting and distinctibly more vocal singing style in most tracks. Also, Aurinko featured one of their biggest future live hits, "Ainomieli".

In a City magazine interview in 2005, when asked about which CMX song should never have been made, A. W. Yrjänä has said: "On Aurinko there's 'Timanttirumpu', that makes no sense at all. It's just growling and drum playing".

Track listing 
All songs written by A. W. Yrjänä and Janne Halmkrona with lyrics by A. W. Yrjänä.

 "Pyhiinvaeltaja" – 3:12 ("Pilgrim")
 "Härjät" – 3:45 ("Bulls")
 "Aivosähköä" – 3:29 ("Brain Electricity")
 "Katariinanpyörä" – 2:30 ("Catherine Wheel")
 "Todellisuuksien yleiset luokat I-IV" – 3:19 ("Universal Classes of Reality I-IV")
 "Tähteinvälinen" – 5:10 ("Interstellar")
 "Manalainen" – 3:21 ("Underworder")
 "Ainomieli" – 3:28
 "Kaksi jokea" – 3:49 ("Two Rivers")
 "Timanttirumpu" – 3:13 ("Diamond Drum")
 "Marian ilmestys" – 5:53 ("Revelation of Mary")
 "Yö ei ole pimeä päivä" – 3:01 <small>("The Night is not a Dark Day")

Credits 
 A. W. Yrjänä - Vocals, Bass guitar, Producer
 Janne Halmkrona - Guitars
 Timo Rasio - Guitars
 Pekka Kanniainen - Drums
 Gabi Hakanen - Producer, Engineer, Mixing
 Anna Kuoppamäki
 Costi Suhonen
 Kikke Heikkinen
 Wagner Keppi
 Mika Paloniemi
 Tapani Rinne
 Kosonen
 Njuga Mol'ubata
 Martti Salminen
 Kain Ärjyvä - Sleeve Design, Photography
 Jolle Penttilä - Photography

References 

1992 albums
CMX (band) albums